Ipomoea pes-tigridis is a species of Ipomoea and family Convolvulaceae. It is known as tiger's footprint (tiger's paw). The species is distributed in Asia, Africa, Australia and other islands in the Pacific. It grows in roadsides and sea coasts which sea level is between 0 and 400 m.

Description 

Ipomoea pes-tigridis is a hairy, vine and annual plant. The trumpet-shaped flower has five points. It can be red, pink or white color and it opens after 4 pm and its flowering period is between September and November.

References

External links 

 Ipomoea pes-tigridis L.

triloba
Taxa named by Carl Linnaeus